Puwaq Hanka (local Quechua puwaq, eight, hanka snowcapped peak or ridge, "eight peaks (or ridges)", hispanicized spelling Puagjanca) is a mountain in the Puwaq Hanka mountain range in the Andes of Peru, about  high. It is located in the Lima Region, Huaral Province, Andamarca District.

References

Mountains of Peru
Mountains of Lima Region